National road 15 (Polish: Droga krajowa nr 15) is a 374 km long G class and GP class national road connecting Trzebnica with Ostróda. It runs through Lower Silesian Voivodeship, Greater Poland Voivodeship, Kuyavian-Pomeranian Voivodeship and Warmian-Masurian Voivodeship. It serves an alternative to National road 5 on Trzebnica - Gniezno segment while skipping Poznań. Later on it leads through farming lands in Kuyavia to Masuria. It crosses A2 motorway in Września.

References 

15